Swift Dam is a dam in Pondera County, Montana, on the southern end of the Blackfeet Indian Reservation.

The embankment structure gave way on June 10, 1964, after heavy rains caused flooding on Birch Creek. The dam collapsed and sent a  wall of water down the creek bed. The nearby dam at Lower Two Medicine Lake also failed, and at least 28 people were killed.

The dams and reservoir are owned and operated by the local Pondera Canal & Reservoir Company.

Recreation is restricted to hiking in the area, with a parking area that requires Blackfeet Nation permission.

References

Dams in Montana
Reservoirs in Montana
United States privately owned dams
Dam failures in the United States
Dams completed in 1967
Buildings and structures in Pondera County, Montana
Arch dams
Landforms of Pondera County, Montana